Supersonic Acrobatic Rocket-Powered Battle-Cars, colloquially known as SARPBC and officially abbreviated as SARP Battle-Cars, is a vehicular soccer video game for the PlayStation 3. The game was released in North America in October 2008, and in Europe in February 2009. The campaign mode of the game is made up of a series of varied mini-games, and tournaments against AI that can only be played in single-player mode. A sequel, titled Rocket League, was released in July 2015.

Gameplay 
The game is played by one or more players, locally or online, using their car to hit a soccer ball that is much larger than the car to score a goal. Each goal is worth one point, and the team with the most points when 5 minutes have passed wins. If both teams are tied when the timer runs out, the game enters the sudden death overtime mode, which lasts indefinitely until either team scores.

There are also many various mini-games and tournaments only available in single player, consisting of situations such as the player being outnumbered by computer-controlled opponents, or objectives such as shooting balls at a goal in a certain amount of time or defending a goal from shots from a cannon. For each completed mini-game or tournament, the player can earn up to 5 stars, depending on how well it was completed, along with various criteria depending on the game in question.

Reception 

Supersonic Acrobatic Rocket-Powered Battle-Cars received mixed reviews by critics according to Metacritic, a review aggregator. It was downloaded on the PlayStation Network over two million times.

Sequel 

In March 2011, Psyonix confirmed that there was a sequel in development but that it was far from completion due to them having difficulty pitching it to publishers or acquiring the finances required to self-publish. In September 2013, Psyonix announced more details, saying that there would be a free alpha version released for testing and improvement on the PC, before being ported to consoles. The game, Rocket League, was released for the PlayStation 4 and Microsoft Windows on July 7, 2015, and for other platforms at later dates.

References

External links 
 

2008 video games
Fantasy sports video games
Multiplayer and single-player video games
PlayStation 3 games
PlayStation 3-only games
PlayStation Network games
Unreal Engine games
Video games developed in the United States
Psyonix games
Indie video games